Salt Creek Township is one of the fourteen townships of Holmes County, Ohio, United States. As of the 2010 census the population was 4,252, up from 3,778 at the 2000 census.

Geography
Located in the northern part of the county, it borders the following townships:
Salt Creek Township, Wayne County - north
Paint Township, Wayne County - northeast corner
Paint Township - east
Walnut Creek Township - southeast corner
Berlin Township - south
Hardy Township - southwest
Prairie Township - west
Franklin Township, Wayne County - northwest corner

No municipalities are located in Salt Creek Township, although the unincorporated community of Mount Hope lies in the eastern part of the township.

Name and history
It is one of five Salt Creek Townships statewide.

Government
The township is governed by a three-member board of trustees, who are elected in November of odd-numbered years to a four-year term beginning on the following January 1. Two are elected in the year after the presidential election and one is elected in the year before it. There is also an elected township fiscal officer, who serves a four-year term beginning on April 1 of the year after the election, which is held in November of the year before the presidential election. Vacancies in the fiscal officership or on the board of trustees are filled by the remaining trustees.

References

External links
County website

Townships in Holmes County, Ohio
Townships in Ohio